The Greatest American was a four-part American television series hosted by Matt Lauer in 2005. The show featured biographies and lists of influential persons in U.S. history, and culminated in a contest in which millions in the audience nominated and voted for the person they felt was the "greatest American". The four-part competition was conducted by AOL and the Discovery Channel and reported on by the BBC.

President Ronald Reagan achieved the highest position. His son, Ronald Reagan Jr., commented to the network that "I'm sure he would be very honored to be in the company of these great gentlemen." In total, the American public cast over 2.4 million votes during the nomination process.

In detail, Martin Luther King Jr. was the highest-ranked person of color, at number three, while Oprah Winfrey, at number nine, was the highest-ranked woman. George W. Bush, at number six, had the highest status of any living American.

Nominations
Nominations were accepted through 31 January 2005. The seven-hour-long series was broken into four episodes: The first episode counted down the top 100 and introduced the top 25 nominees in alphabetical order. The second episode featured biographies of the top 25 nominees as well as commentaries from influential people such as celebrities and politicians. The third episode, called "The Great Debate", introduced the top five nominees and pitted the studio audience supporters of each of the nominees and a person selected to represent each of the top five candidates against a panel of three celebrities. In the finale, the top five "Greatest Americans" were announced as well as what percentage of the votes each had received. Votes were taken through a toll-free (if calling from a land line) phone number, through text messages from cellphones, and through online voting. Voters were allowed to vote three times per voting method, so anyone had a chance of voting at least nine times.

Top twenty-five

 Ronald Reagan (1911–2004), actor and 40th president
 Abraham Lincoln (1809–1865), 16th president
 Martin Luther King Jr. (1929–1968), minister and civil rights leader
 George Washington (1732–1799), general and 1st president
 Benjamin Franklin (1706–1790), author, printer, scientist and politician
 George W. Bush (born 1946), 43rd president
 Bill Clinton (born 1946), 42nd president
 Elvis Presley (1935–1977), musician and actor
 Oprah Winfrey (born 1954), talk show host and actress
 Franklin D. Roosevelt (1882–1945), 32nd president
 Billy Graham (1918–2018), minister
 Thomas Jefferson (1743–1826), writer and 3rd president
 Walt Disney (1901–1966), animator and film producer
 Albert Einstein (1879–1955), physicist (born in Germany)
 Thomas Alva Edison (1847–1931), inventor
 John F. Kennedy (1917–1963), 35th president
 Bob Hope (1903–2003), actor and comedian (born in England)
 Bill Gates (born 1955), businessman
 Eleanor Roosevelt (1884–1962), First Lady, activist and diplomat
 Lance Armstrong (born 1971), cyclist
 Muhammad Ali (1942–2016), boxer
 Rosa Parks (1913–2005), civil rights activist 
 The Wright Brothers, inventors and aviation pioneers
 Henry Ford (1863–1947), industrialist and businessman 
 Neil Armstrong (1930–2012), astronaut

Alphabetical list
On 18 April 2005, AOL and The Discovery Channel announced the top 100 nominees.

The remaining 75 nominees:

 Maya Angelou (1928–2014), poet and writer
 Susan B. Anthony (1820–1904), women's rights activist
 Lucille Ball (1911–1989), actress and comedian
 Alexander Graham Bell (1847–1922), inventor and scientist
 Barbara Bush (1925–2018), First Lady
 George H. W. Bush (1924–2018), 41st president
 Laura Bush (born 1946), First Lady
 Andrew Carnegie (1835–1919), industrialist and philanthropist
 Johnny Carson (1925–2005), comedian and talk show host
 Jimmy Carter (born 1924), 39th president
 George Washington Carver (the 1860s–1943), botanist and inventor
 Ray Charles (1930–2004), musician
 César Chávez (1927–1993), labor leader and activist
 Hillary Clinton (born 1947), politician
 Bill Cosby (born 1937), comedian
 Tom Cruise (born 1962), actor
 Ellen DeGeneres (born 1958), comedian and talk show host
 Frederick Douglass (1818–1895), writer and abolitionist
 Amelia Earhart (1897–1937), aviator
 Clint Eastwood (born 1930), actor and film director
 John Edwards (born 1953), politician
 Dwight D. Eisenhower (1890–1969), general and 34th president
 Brett Favre (born 1969), football player
 Mel Gibson (born 1956), actor and film director
 Rudolph Giuliani (born 1944), politician
 John Glenn (1921–2016), astronaut and politician
 Alexander Hamilton (1757–1804), statesman and 1st Secretary of the Treasury
 Tom Hanks (born 1956), actor
 Hugh Hefner (1926–2017), magazine publisher
 Katharine Hepburn (1907–2003), actress
 Howard Hughes (1907–1979), businessman, film producer, and aviator
 Michael Jackson (1958–2009), musician
 Steve Jobs (1955–2011), businessman and inventor
 Lyndon B. Johnson (1908–1973), 36th president
 Michael Jordan (born 1963), basketball player
 Helen Keller (1880–1968), author and activist
 Jacqueline Kennedy Onassis (1929–1994), First Lady
 Robert F. Kennedy (1925–1968), politician
 Rush Limbaugh (1951–2021), radio talk show host
 Charles Lindbergh (1902–1974), aviator
 George Lucas (born 1944), film director
 Madonna (born 1958), musician
 Malcolm X (1925–1965), civil rights activist
 Phil McGraw (born 1950), psychologist and television personality
 Marilyn Monroe (1926–1962), actress
 Michael Moore (born 1954), documentary filmmaker
 Audie Murphy (1925–1971), soldier
 Richard M. Nixon (1913–1994), 37th president
 Barack Obama (born 1961), politician (became 44th president after airing)
 Jesse Owens (1913–1980), track and field athlete
 George S. Patton (1885–1945), general
 Colin Powell (1937–2021), politician and general
 Christopher Reeve (1952–2004), actor
 Condoleezza Rice (born 1954), politician and diplomat
 Jackie Robinson (1919–1972), baseball player
 Theodore Roosevelt (1858–1919), writer, explorer, naturalist, and 26th president
 Babe Ruth (1895–1948), baseball player
 Carl Sagan (1934–1996), astronomer and writer
 Jonas Salk (1914–1995), medical researcher
 Arnold Schwarzenegger (born 1947), actor and politician
 Frank Sinatra (1915–1998), musician and actor
 Joseph Smith, Jr. (1805–1844), religious leader
 Steven Spielberg (born 1946), film director
 James Stewart (1908–1997), actor
 Martha Stewart (born 1941), businesswoman, writer, and television personality
 Nikola Tesla (1856–1943), inventor
 Pat Tillman (1976–2004), football player and soldier
 Harry S. Truman (1884–1972), 33rd president
 Donald Trump (born 1946), businessman (became 45th president after airing)
 Harriet Tubman (1822–1913), abolitionist
 Mark Twain (1835–1910), writer and humorist
 Sam Walton (1918–1992), businessman
 John Wayne (1907–1979), actor
 Tiger Woods (born 1975), golfer
 Chuck Yeager (1923–2020), aviator

Other editions
 Other countries have produced similar shows, see also: Greatest Britons spin-offs

References

External links
 The Greatest American page on The Discovery Channel

Discovery Channel original programming
American
Lists of American people
2005 American television series debuts
2005 American television series endings